Franz Schafheitlin (9 August 1895 – 6 February 1980) was a German film actor. He appeared in more than 160 films between 1927 and 1974. He was born in Berlin, Germany and died in Pullach, Germany.

Selected filmography

 The Bordellos of Algiers (1927)
 Mariett Dances Today (1928)
 The Wonderful Lies of Nina Petrovna (1929)
 Napoleon at Saint Helena (1929)
 Money on the Street (1930) as Bornhausen
 Storm in a Water Glass (1931) as Prosecutor
 The Ringer (1932) as Sergeant Carter
 Daughter of the Regiment (1933) as Major
 Sonnenstrahl (1933) as Ein Arzt im Unfallkrankenhaus
 Frasquita (1934) as Juan
 The Secret of Cavelli (1934)
 Asew (1935) as Urzoff
 The Cossack and the Nightingale (1935) as R12
 Eva (135) as Stefan, ein Arbeiter
 The Eternal Mask (1935) as Monsieur Negar
 Leutnant Bobby, der Teufelskerl (1935)
 ...nur ein Komödiant (1935) as Blanchet, court painter
 Die Pompadour (1935) as Graf Aragnac
 Augustus the Strong (1936) as Flemming
 Singende Jugend as Brunner, Präfekt
 Die Puppenfee (1936)
 The Cabbie's Song (1936) as Max Jolander
 Ball at the Metropol (1937) as Steltendorff
 IA in Oberbayern (1937) as Dr. Hans Hemann, Rechtsanwalt
 Another World (1937) as Dr. Herbert Carter
 Anna Favetti (1938) as Dr. Thom
 Heimat (1938) as Bank Director von Keller
 Steputat & Co. (1938) as Staatsanwalt
 So You Don't Know Korff Yet? (1938) as Morton
 The Immortal Heart (1939) as Squire Zinderl
 The Green Emperor (1939) as the procuror n°2
 Der vierte kommt nicht (1939) as Richter Tilenius
 Marguerite : 3 (1939) as Dr. Ludwig Findeisen
 Dein Leben gehört mir (1939)
 Das Lied der Wüste (1939) as Finanzier
 Maria Ilona (1939) as Captain von Sailern
 Der singende Tor (1939) as Staatsanwalt
 Angelika (1940) as Immerzeel jun.
 Die lustigen Vagabunden (1940) as Dr. Klamm, Kunstkritiker
 Kora Terry (1940) as Vopescu
 Bismarck (1940) as Fürst Metternich
 My Life for Ireland (1941) as Harrison
 Ohm Kruger (1941) as Lord Kitchener
 Friedemann Bach (1941) as Secretary Siepmann (uncredited)
 Ich klage an (1941) as Rechtsanwalt Straten
 Menschen im Sturm (1941) as Kommisar Subotic
 The Great King (1942) as Commandant Bernburg
 The Thing About Styx (1942)
 Die heimlichen Bräute (1942) as Oberstaatsanwalt Dr. Burgmeier
 A Gust of Wind (1942) as the chief judge
 Rembrandt (1942)
 Andreas Schlüter (1942) as Mr. von Harms
 Die Entlassung (1942) as Botschafter Graf Schuwalow
 Stimme des Herzens (1942) as Direktor Möller
 With the Eyes of a Woman (1942) as Baron von Stein
 Liebesgeschichten (1943) as Herr Rechenmacher
 Münchhausen (1943) as Doge (uncredited)
 Paracelsus (1943) as Erasmus von Rotterdam
 Fahrt ins Abenteuer (1943) as Verleger Helmut Burke
 Titanic (1943) as Hunderson
 Die beiden Schwestern (1943) as Opernindendant
 Gefährlicher Frühling (1943) as Arthur Friedeborn
 Herr Sanders lebt gefährlich (1944) as Romberg, Regierungsrat
 Der große Preis (1944) as Greininger
 The Roedern Affair (1944) as Marquis d'Orion
 Ich habe von dir geträumt (1944) as Helenes Vater
 The Black Robe (1944) as Dr. Lindener
 Opfergang (1944) as Matthias
 Das war mein Leben (1944) as Baron Schark
 Philharmoniker (1944) as Ministerialrat
 Kolberg (1945) as Fanselow
 The Years Pass (1945) as Judicial Counsellor Carlsen
 Meine Herren Söhne (1945) as Ministerialdirektor
 Eines Tages (1945) as Dr. Wegner
 Der Erbförster (1945)
 Das Leben geht weiter (1945)
 In Those Days (1947) as Wolfgang Buschenhagen
 Finale (1948) as Professor Grammann
 Insolent and in Love (1948) as Justus Pernrieder, Fabrikant
 The Last Night (1949) as Administration Counsellor Borner
 Verführte Hände (1949) as Dr. Beermann
 Die Andere (1949) as Prof. Eckbert Litten
 Trouble Backstairs (1949) as Procuror
 Kätchen für alles (1949) as Professor Gerlach
 How Do We Tell Our Children? (1949)
 Dangerous Guests (1949) as Dr. Roeder
 Shadows in the Night (1950)
 One Night Apart (1950) as Burgomaster
 Dreizehn unter einem Hut (1950) as Eddi Winterthur
 Gabriela (1950) as Hausherr
 Blondes for Export (1950) as Polizeikommissar (Rio)
 The Beautiful Galatea (1950)
 Abundance of Life (1950) as Professor
 Mathilde Möhring (1950)
 Harbour Melody (1950) as Arzt
 The Wooden Horse (1950) as Camp Commandant
 The Rabanser Case (1950) as Polizeirat
 The Girl from the South Seas (1950)
 Melody of Fate (1950) as Hugo Müller
 Immortal Beloved (1951) as Talma
 Professor Nachtfalter (1951)
 Das fremde Leben (1951) as Herr Barkhausen
 Dr. Holl (1951) as Professor Godenbergh
 The Guilt of Doctor Homma (1951) as Landgerichtsdirektor von Herkenrath
 Grün ist die Heide (1951) (uncredited)
 The Lady in Black (1951) as Chief Inspector Marshall
 The Csardas Princess (1951) as Leopold von Weylersheim
 Hanna Amon (1951) as Prison Director (uncredited)
 A Heidelberg Romance (1951) as Bellboy
 The Great Temptation (1952) as Landrat Rochwald
 We'll Talk About Love Later (1953) as Juwelier Penzner
 Secretly Still and Quiet (1953)
 Everything for Father (1953) as Betriebsdirektor
 The Country Schoolmaster (1954) as Senator Vanlos
 Regina Amstetten (1954) as Hotelportier Mohr
 Sanatorium total verrückt (1954)
 Confession Under Four Eyes (1954) as Chef Director Dr. Kopp
 Ingrid – Die Geschichte eines Fotomodells (1955) as Ingrids Onkel
 Music, Music and Only Music (1955) as Berndorff
 The Priest from Kirchfeld (1955) as Oberstaatsanwalt
 Your Life Guards (1955) as Flügeladjutant
 My Brother Joshua (1956) as Der Bürgermeister
 As Long as the Roses Bloom (1956) as Kunsthändler
 Es wird alles wieder gut (1957) as Dr. Berger, Fernsehintendant
 All Roads Lead Home (1957) as Grumke
 Greetings and Kisses from Tegernsee (1957) as Büroleiter
 Night Nurse Ingeborg (1958) as Oberarzt Dr. Ranzau
 Schmutziger Engel (1958) as Untersuchungsrichter Wangen
 Grabenplatz 17 (1958) as Dr. Bühler
 Vater, Mutter und neun Kinder (1958)
 Die schöne Lügnerin (1959) as British Ambassador Lord Stewart (uncredited)
 The Forests Sing Forever (1959) as Shopkeeper Holder
 The Inheritance of Bjorndal (1960) as Shopkeeper Holder
  (1961) as Dr. Kienast
 The Dead Eyes of London (1961) as Sir John
 Soft Shoulders, Sharp Curves (1972) as Opa Eugen
 Was wissen Sie von Titipu? (1972) as Mikado
 The Twins from Immenhof (1973) as Dr. Tiedemann, Tierarzt
 Zwei im 7. Himmel (1974) as Theo Sommer
 Spring in Immenhof (1974) as Dr. Tiedemann

References

External links

1895 births
1980 deaths
German male film actors
German male silent film actors
Male actors from Berlin
20th-century German male actors